The 1934 Michigan gubernatorial election was held on November 6, 1934. Republican nominee Frank Fitzgerald defeated Democratic nominee Arthur J. Lacy with 52.41% of the vote.

General election

Candidates
Major party candidates
Frank Fitzgerald, Republican
Arthur J. Lacy, Democratic
Other candidates
Arthur E. Larsen, Socialist
John Anderson, Communism
Donald D. Alderdyce, Farmer–Labor Party
Robert Fraser, Socialist Labor
Lincoln E. Buell, Commonwealth
Robert R. Pointer, People's Progressive
Ann L. Medow, National
Edward N. Lee, American

Results

Primaries

Republican Primary

Democratic Primary

References

1934
Michigan
Gubernatorial
November 1934 events